Barca (earlier also Borica, Baraca)  is a village and municipality in the Rimavská Sobota District of the Banská Bystrica Region of southern Slovakia.

History
In historical records, the village was first mentioned in 1343 (1343 Barasta, 1345 Barachcha) as a royal donation to the family of the knight Ratold. Historically, the village was the part of the Kingdom of Hungary until 1920. From the 16th century it belonged to the Chapter of Eger, later on to the Jesuits of Košice. From 1938 to 1945 it was part of Hungary again under the First Vienna Award.

Genealogical resources

The records for genealogical research are available at the state archive "Statny Archiv in Banska Bystrica, Slovakia"

 Roman Catholic church records (births/marriages/deaths): 1789-1896 (parish A)
 Lutheran church records (births/marriages/deaths): 1730-1896 (parish B)
 Reformated church records (births/marriages/deaths): 1707-1871 (parish B)

See also
 List of municipalities and towns in Slovakia

External links
https://web.archive.org/web/20070927203415/http://www.statistics.sk/mosmis/eng/run.html 
http://www.e-obce.sk/obec/barca/barca.html
Surnames of living people in Barca

Villages and municipalities in Rimavská Sobota District
Hungarian communities in Slovakia